Ann Parker may refer to:

Ann Parker (writer), historical and science writer
Ann Parker (athlete), represented Scotland at 1976 IAAF World Cross Country Championships – Senior women's race
Ann Parker (photographer); see Muhammad Afifi Matar
Ann Parker (doll artist); see Dollmaker

See also
Anne Parker (disambiguation)
Annie Parker, protagonist in film Decoding Annie Parker